Tong Kraham (UNGEGN: Tóng Krâhâm) was a Cambodian journal, organ of the Communist Youth League of Kampuchea. The magazine was founded by Saloth Sar ('Pol Pot') when he returned to Cambodia in 1966. It was published in Khmer language and was named after a Chinese political magazine named Red Flag.

References

Magazines published in Cambodia
Communist magazines
Defunct political magazines
Defunct magazines published in Cambodia
Magazines established in 1966
Magazines with year of disestablishment missing